Emil Görlitz (13 June 1903 – 17 October 1990) was a Polish footballer. He played in eight matches for the Poland national team between 1924 and 1925.

References

External links
 

1903 births
1990 deaths
Sportspeople from Katowice
Polish footballers
Poland international footballers
Association footballers not categorized by position